Kingsley Akpososo (born 12 June 1990 in Brass) is a Nigerian footballer who currently plays for Niger Tornadoes.

Career
Akpososo began his career with Ocean Boys F.C., who won in the 2008/2009 season the cup  he signed on 5 September 2009 for League rival Niger Tornadoes

Honours
 2008: FA Cup Winner

References 

1990 births
Living people
Nigerian footballers
Ocean Boys F.C. players
Niger Tornadoes F.C. players
Association football midfielders